Floral Hall, also known as Standardbred Stable of Memories, is an octagonal building designed by John McMurtry in Lexington, Kentucky.  It was built in 1882 as an exhibition hall for floral displays on the fairgrounds of the Kentucky Agricultural & Mechanical Association.

It is notable for its architecture and was listed on the National Register of Historic Places in 1977.

References

National Register of Historic Places in Lexington, Kentucky
Event venues established in 1882
Event venues on the National Register of Historic Places in Kentucky
Octagonal buildings in the United States
1882 establishments in Kentucky
Floral industry